was a professional wrestling event promoted by World Wonder Ring Stardom. It took place on November 15, 2020 in Sendai, Japan, at the Sendai Sun Plaza with a limited attendance due in part to the ongoing COVID-19 pandemic at the time.

Storylines
The show featured eight professional wrestling matches that resulted from scripted storylines, where wrestlers portrayed villains, heroes, or less distinguishable characters in the scripted events that built tension and culminated in a wrestling match or series of matches.

Event
The first match of the night saw Donna Del Mondo's Maika retaining the Future of Stardom Championship over Stars' Saya Iida, where she scored her second defense in a row. In the next match, Starlight Kid came out victorious from a five-way confrontation against Hina, Saya Kamitani and Stars stablemate Hanan. Next, the Stars sub-unit of Cosmic Angels picked up a win over Natsuko Tora, Rina and Saki Kashima. The fourth match saw AZM defending her High Speed Championship against Gokigen death, securing her second defense in a row. The fifth match had Queen's Quest leader Momo Watanabe picking up a victory over the 2020 5Star GP runner up Himeka. Next, Syuri defeated Bea Priestley to win the SWA World Championship. The semi main-event portraited Giulia defeating Konami to retain the Wonder of Stardom Championship for the third time in a row.

The main event showed the 2020 5Star Grand Prix Tournament winner Utami Hayashishita (who was also one half of the Goddess of Stardom Champions at that time) cash in her opportunity and successfully capturing the World of Stardom Championship from Mayu Iwatani. After the match concluded, she received a challenge from her stablemate Momo Watanabe. Giulia and Syuri also shook hands for a winner takes all match for both Wonder and SWA World titles.

Results

References

External links
Page Stardom World

2020 in professional wrestling
Women's professional wrestling shows
World Wonder Ring Stardom shows
World Wonder Ring Stardom